Guy Marchand (23 June 1943 – 22 June 2015) was a French wrestler. He competed in two events at the 1968 Summer Olympics.

References

External links
 

1943 births
2015 deaths
French male sport wrestlers
Olympic wrestlers of France
Wrestlers at the 1968 Summer Olympics
Sportspeople from Dijon
20th-century French people